Face Noir is a point-and-click adventure puzzle video game developed by Italian studio Mad Orange and published by Phoenix Online Studios. It released in July 2013 for Microsoft Windows, OS X, and Linux.

Synopsis
The player assumes the role of Jack Del Nero, a detective who is falsely accused of killing a man who left a little girl in Jack's protection. Jack must clear his name, figure out who the little girl is, and who murdered the man.

Development
The game was developed by Mad Orange, an Italian studio consisting of Gabriele Papalini and Marco Sgolmin. It was localized by Phoenix Online Studios. Papalini and Sgolmin cited Italian cinema from the 1950s and works from actor Nino Manfredi. The game was released for Windows, OS X, and Linux on July 18, 2013, and for Steam on October 17, 2013.

Reception

Face Noir received a 59/100 from review score aggregate Metacritic.

References

External links

2013 video games
Detective video games
Linux games
MacOS games
Neo-noir video games
Point-and-click adventure games
Puzzle video games
Video games developed in Italy
Video games set in 1934
Video games set in New York City
Windows games